Gordon Joseph Hawkins (1919 in London, England – February 29, 2004 in Manly, New South Wales, Australia) was an Australian criminologist. He served as a professor at the University of Sydney's Institute of Criminology from 1961 to 1984, and was the Institute's director from 1981 to 1985. After retiring in 1984, he served as a senior fellow at the University of California, Berkeley's Earl Warren Legal Institute until 2001. From 1970 to 1999, he published twelve books, nine of which were co-authored with Berkeley professor Franklin Zimring. His first book, The Honest Politician's Guide to Crime Control, was co-authored by Norval Morris and published by the University of Chicago Press in 1970.

References

External links
Obituaries: Professor Alex Castles & Associate Professor Gordon Hawkins, Reform Journal (Australian Law Reform Commission), Autumn 2004

1919 births
2004 deaths
Australian criminologists
Academic staff of the University of Sydney
UC Berkeley School of Law faculty
British emigrants to Australia